Taras Mikhailovich Bezubyak (born July 25, 1955, Chortkiv, Ternopil Oblast, Ukrainian SSR, USSR) is a Soviet and Russian football referee, one of Russia's most respected arbiters 90s. International judge FIFA referee.

From 1977 to 2003, he served more than 300 games at various levels of professional football.

References

External links
 Тарас Безубяк: Ответил Тихонову: «По субботам руки в штрафной не считаются» 
 

1955 births
Living people
People from Chortkiv
Soviet football referees
Russian football referees
Soviet footballers
Association footballers not categorized by position